A quartz arenite or quartzarenite is a sandstone composed  of greater than 90% detrital quartz.  Quartz arenites are the most mature sedimentary rocks possible, and are often referred to as ultra- or super-mature, and are usually cemented by silica.  They often exhibit both textural and compositional maturity.  The two primary sedimentary depositional environments that produce quartz arenites are beaches/upper shoreface and aeolian processes.

See also

References

Further reading
 
 
 
 
 

sandstone
sedimentary rocks